In Search of Greatness is a documentary film directed by Gabe Polsky, best known for directing the award-winning documentary Red Army, released on November 2, 2018. Featuring original interviews with famous sporting-world figures Wayne Gretzky, Jerry Rice, and Pelé, In Search of Greatness explores the role of creativity in the careers of the world's greatest athletes, both historical and contemporary. The movie also features interviews with authors and creativity experts Ken Robinson and David Epstein.

Some well-known sports personalities spotlighted in the film are Serena Williams, Tom Brady, Muhammad Ali, Rocky Marciano, Red Auerbach, and Michael Jordan. A number of major cultural figures' careers are also highlighted for comparison to those of top athletes, including The Beatles, David Bowie and Jimi Hendrix.

In April 2018, The Hollywood Reporter published an article upon the release of the film's first trailer, calling In Search of Greatness "an early contender for the best documentary feature Oscar." The film was later nominated for Best Documentary Screenplay from the Writers Guild of America.

During an April 2018 interview with Sports Illustrated Now discussing what inspired the film, Polsky said "Every boy and girl has their own variables, their own creative abilities. And I think everyone needs to find their own creative abilities because that's what separates you from everybody else. That's your competitive advantage...Kids who have potential are often put to the side, and we leave a lot on the table."

In Search of Greatness is a co-production with IMG Films.

References 

2018 films
2010s English-language films
Films directed by Gabe Polsky